Hasbullah bin Osman (17 February 1957 – 16 November 2020) was a Malaysian politician who served as Chairman of the Syarikat Perumahan Negara Berhad (SPNB) from May 2020, Member of Parliament (MP) for Gerik from May 2013 to his death in November 2020 and Member of the Perak State Legislative Assembly (MLA) for Temenggor from March 2004 to May 2013. He was member of the United Malays National Organisation, a component party of the Barisan Nasional (BN) coalition.

Death
On 16 November 2020, Hasbullah died from a heart attack. He was 63 years old.

Election results

Honours
  :
  Member of the Order of the Perak State Crown (AMP) (1991)
  Knight Commander of the Order of the Perak State Crown (DPMP) – Dato’ (2005)

References

1957 births
2020 deaths
People from Perak
Malaysian people of Malay descent
Malaysian Muslims
United Malays National Organisation politicians
Members of the Dewan Rakyat
21st-century Malaysian politicians